La Ferté-sous-Jouarre is a commune in the Seine-et-Marne département in the Île-de-France region in north-central France.

It is located at a crossing point over the river Marne between Meaux and Château-Thierry.

History

This area of France has frequently been a site of warfare. In 1819, British naval officer, Norwich Duff (1792–1862), Edinburgh born, recorded a note on La Ferté. The Bourbon Restoration had apparently dampened the Napoleonic road building boom, as evidenced by unused milestones. Construction projects had rebuilt some facilities destroyed in the wars with Britain and other Powers.

La Ferté is famous for millstones used for milling flour. Some have even been found in England.

Among notable residents, the artist Émile Bayard was born in this town (1837). The Irish avant-garde writer, dramatist, poet and nobel prize winner Samuel Beckett lived in the neighboring hamlet of Mollien for 36 years. The town's library and secondary school are named after him. André the Giant, three times Worldwide Wrestling champion, icon of the André the Giant Has a Posse (aka Obey) street art project grew up in the local canton. As a child, the American writer and filmmaker Oliver Stone used to spend all his summer holiday at his French maternal grands-parents' hotel in La Ferté-sous-Jouarre.

The area was invaded and occupied by the Germans from the beginning of the Great War, which led to considerable damage and casualties. After the war, on 14 August 1921, the town of La Ferté-sous-Jouarre was awarded the War Cross with the following citation:

On the south-western edge of the town, on the south bank of the river Marne, is the La Ferté-sous-Jouarre memorial, commemorating more than 3000 British soldiers from the Great War with no known grave. They died in fighting in the area against the Germans.

Demographics
Inhabitants of La Ferté-sous-Jouarre are called Fertois in French.

Notable residents 
 Antoine of Navarre (1518–1562), King of Navarre, Father Henri IV
 Charles, Cardinal de Bourbon (1523–1590), French Cardinal
 Madame de Pompadour (1721–1764), member of the French court
 Antoine Samuel Adam-Salomon (1818–1881), French sculptor & photography pioneer
 Fanny Marc (1858–1937), French sculptor
 Henri Pouctal (1860–1922), early French silent film director
 Maurice Holleaux (1861–1932), 19th–20th-century French historian, archaeologist and epigrapher died in the city.
 Samuel Beckett (1906–1989), Irish avant-garde writer, dramatist, and poet
 Maurice Tranchant de Lunel (1869-1944), French architect born in La Ferté-sous-Jouarre
 André the Giant (1946–1993), Triple Worldwide Wrestling champion, wrestler and icon of the Andre the Giant Has a Posse (Obey) street art
 Oliver Stone (1946–), American writer and filmmaker.
 Robert Hampson (1965–), English musician, singer, composer

Twin towns
 Zuffenhausen-Stuttgart, Germany

See also
Communes of the Seine-et-Marne department

References

External links

1999 Land Use, from IAURIF (Institute for Urban Planning and Development of the Paris-Île-de-France région) 

Visit of Oliver Stone in La Ferté sous Jouarre 

Communes of Seine-et-Marne
Champagne (province)
France in World War I